This is a list of the winning and nominated programs of the Primetime Emmy Award for Outstanding Music Supervision. The award was instituted in 2017.

In the following list, the first titles listed in gold are the winners; those not in gold are nominees, which are listed in alphabetical order. The years given are those in which the ceremonies took place:



Winners and nominations

2010s

2020s

Programs with multiple awards
3 awards
 The Marvelous Mrs. Maisel

Programs with multiple nominations

4 nominations
 Better Call Saul
 The Marvelous Mrs. Maisel
 Stranger Things

2 nominations
 Euphoria

References

Film music awards
Music Supervision